The Staatsoper Unter den Linden ( State Opera under the Lime Trees), also known as the Berlin State Opera, is a listed building on Unter den Linden boulevard in the historic center of Berlin, Germany. The opera house was built by order of Prussian king Frederick the Great from 1741 to 1743 according to plans by Georg Wenzeslaus von Knobelsdorff in the Palladian style. Damaged during the Allied bombing in World War II, the former Royal Prussian Opera House was rebuilt from 1951 to 1955 as part of the Forum Fridericianum square. Nicknamed Lindenoper in Berlin, it is "the first theater anywhere to be, by itself, a prominent, freestanding monumental building in a city."

History

Names
Originally called the Königliche Oper (Royal Opera) from 1743, it was renamed as the Preußische Staatsoper (Prussian State Opera) in 1919, then as the Deutsche Staatsoper  in 1955. Until 1990, it housed the state opera of East Germany. Since 1990, it is officially called the Staatsoper Unter den Linden (State Opera Unter den Linden).

Early years

King Frederick II of Prussia, shortly after his accession to the throne, commissioned the original building on the site. Though architecturally significant as an early example of the Palladian revival in Germany, the north and west façades are direct copies of Colen Campbell's elevations at Stourhead and Wanstead respectively. Construction work began in July 1741, with what was designed by Georg Wenzeslaus von Knobelsdorff to be the first part of a "Forum Fredericianum" on present-day Bebelplatz. Although not entirely completed, the Court Opera (Hofoper) was inaugurated with a performance of Carl Heinrich Graun's Cesare e Cleopatra on 7 December 1742. This event marked the beginning of the successful, 250-year co-operation between the Staatsoper and the Staatskapelle Berlin, the state orchestra, whose roots trace back to the 16th century.

In 1821, the Berlin Opera—hosted at the Schauspielhaus Berlin—gave the premiere of Weber's Der Freischütz. In 1842, Wilhelm Taubert instituted the tradition of regular symphonic concerts. In the same year, Giacomo Meyerbeer succeeded Gaspare Spontini as General Music Director. Felix Mendelssohn also conducted symphonic concerts for a year.

On 18 August 1843 the Linden Opera was destroyed by fire. The reconstruction of the building was supervised by architect Carl Ferdinand Langhans, and the Königliches Opernhaus (Royal Opera House) was inaugurated the following autumn by a performance of Meyerbeer's Ein Feldlager in Schlesien. In 1849, Otto Nicolai's Die lustigen Weiber von Windsor was premiered at the Royal Opera House, conducted by the composer.

20th century

At the end of the 19th century and the beginning of the 20th century, the Royal Court Opera, Berlin, attracted many illustrious conductors. They included Felix von Weingartner, Karl Muck, Richard Strauss, Leo Blech and George Szell. After the collapse of the German Empire in 1918, the Opera was renamed Staatsoper Unter den Linden and the Königliche Kapelle became Kapelle der Staatsoper.

In the 1920s, Kurt Adler, Wilhelm Furtwängler, Erich Kleiber, Otto Klemperer, Alexander von Zemlinsky, Bruno Walter occupied the conductor's post. In 1925, Alban Berg's Wozzeck, was given its premiere in a production conducted by Erich Kleiber in the composer's presence.

After having undergone an extensive renovation, the Linden Opera reopened on 28 April 1928 with a new production of Mozart's Die Zauberflöte. The cast included Delia Reinhardt, Richard Tauber, Friedrich Schorr and Leo Schützendorf, conducted by Erich Kleiber. The same year, the famous Russian bass Feodor Chaliapin and Serge Diaghilev's Ballets Russes with conductor Ernest Ansermet were guest performers. In 1930 Erich Kleiber conducted the premiere of Darius Milhaud's Christophe Colomb. However, in 1934, when symphonic pieces from Alban Berg's Lulu were performed by Kleiber, the National Socialists provoked a scandal and the conductor was forced into exile.

After the Machtergreifung by the Nazis, members of Jewish origin were dismissed from the ensemble. Many German musicians associated with the opera went into exile, including the conductors Kurt Adler, Otto Klemperer and Fritz Busch. Clemens Krauss became a prominent German conductor first at the Berlin State Opera in 1933 and was then appointed as its director in 1935 due to Fritz Busch and Erich Kleiber resigning, respectively, their positions in protest over Nazi rule. In Nazi Germany, Robert Heger, Herbert von Karajan (1939–1945) and Johannes Schüler were the "Staatskapellmeister".

 1938: Werner Egk conducted the first night of his opera Peer Gynt on 24 November. Herbert von Karajan's interpretation of Die Zauberflöte was performed on 18 December. Karajan continued as Generalmusikdirektor, the principal musical director of the Staatsoper Unter den Linden between 1941 and 1945.
 1939: Karajan conducted a performance of Rudolf Wagner-Régeny's Die Bürger von Calais.
 1940: On 21 October, Karajan conducted a symphonic concert with the Staatskapelle at the Old Philharmonic.
 1942: The Lindenoper was bombed in 1941. The house reopened on 12 December with Furtwängler's interpretation of Wagner's Die Meistersinger von Nürnberg.
 1944: When Joseph Goebbels proclaimed his "total war", the Staatsoper was closed. The last performance before was Mozart's Le nozze di Figaro, conducted by Johannes Schüler on 31 August. The Staatskapelle continued to perform symphonic and opera concerts. On 4 and 5 October, Karajan conducted Bruckner's Eighth Symphony.
 1945: The Lindenoper was once again destroyed on 3 February. The concerts were relocated to the Admiralspalast and the Schauspielhaus. On 18 February, Karajan conducted his last symphonic concert with the Staatskapelle in the Beethoven hall.

Postwar years

The second rebuilding took a long time. From 1945, the opera company performed at the Admiralspalast. From 1949, the company served as the state opera of East Germany. It moved back to its original home after the rebuilding in freely adapted baroque forms was finally completed in 1955. The newly rebuilt opera house was opened, again, with Wagner's Die Meistersinger von Nürnberg. The capacity is now about 1,300. After the Berlin Wall was built in 1961, the Opera was somewhat isolated, but still maintained a comprehensive repertoire that featured the classic and romantic period together with contemporary ballet and operas.

After reunification, the Linden Opera rejoined the operatic world. Important works that had already performed in the past were rediscovered and discussed anew within the framework of a "Berlin Dramaturgy". Baroque Opera in particular was at the center of attention, with Graun's Cleopatra e Cesare, Keiser's Croesus, Florian Leopold Gassmann's L'opera seria and Scarlatti's Griselda. These works were performed by Belgian conductor René Jacobs together with the Akademie für Alte Musik Berlin and the Freiburger Barockorchester on period instruments. In the 1990s, the opera was officially renamed Staatsoper Unter den Linden.

In 1992, the Argentine-Israeli conductor Daniel Barenboim was appointed Music Director. In 2000, the orchestra (according to its official website) elected Barenboim "conductor for life." During the 2002 Festtage, he led a Wagner cycle in ten parts, a production created in collaboration with director Harry Kupfer.  On 6 January 2023, the company announced the resignation of Barenboim as its General Music Director", for health reasons.

In 2009, the Berlin State Opera was closed for renovation work led by German architect HG Merz. The roof of the opera building was raised and the proscenium prolonged to improve the acoustics. Other renovation and extension efforts included the director's building, the below-ground connection building and the depot building. The latter houses the new rehearsal center.

The house was reopened in 2017 with premieres of Humperdinck's Hänsel und Gretel and Monteverdi's L'incoronazione di Poppea on one weekend. The opera house also hosts the Staatskapelle Berlin orchestra.

Leadership

References

External links

  
  Berlin State Opera at Google Cultural Institute
 

 
German opera companies
Buildings and structures in Mitte
1742 establishments in the Holy Roman Empire
Music in Berlin
Opera houses in Germany
Theatres in Berlin
Ballet venues
Theatres completed in 1742
Music venues completed in 1742
Rebuilt buildings and structures in Berlin
1742 establishments in Prussia